Khlong Udom Chonlajorn Railway Halt is a railway halt in eastern Thailand, located in the area of Khlong Udom Chonlajorn Subdistrict, Mueang Chachoengsao District, Chachoengsao Province.

This station is a part of the eastern railway line, can be considered as the first stop of the province on this line. It is 43.43 km (about 26 mi) from Bangkok railway station (Hua Lamphong).

Although the halt has a station building, it was abandoned like other nearby halts between Hua Takhe and Chachoengsao Junction.

Train services
Ordinary train No. 275/276 Bangkok - Aranyaprathet - Bangkok
 Ordinary train No. 277/278 Bangkok - Kabin Buri - Bangkok
 Ordinary train No. 279/280 Bangkok - Aranyaprathet - Bangkok
 Ordinary train No. 281/282 Bangkok - Kabin Buri - Bangkok
 Ordinary train No. 283/284 Bangkok - Ban Phlu Ta Luang - Bangkok
 Ordinary train No. 285/286 Bangkok - Chachoengsao Junction - Bangkok
 Ordinary train No. 368  Chachoengsao Junction - Bangkok
 Ordinary train No. 371/372 Bangkok - Prachin Buri - Bangkok
 Ordinary train No. 376/378 Rangsit - Hua Takhe - Bangkok
 Ordinary train No. 379/380 Bangkok - Hua Takhe - Bangkok
 Ordinary train No. 381/382 Bangkok - Chachoengsao Junction - Bangkok
 Ordinary train No. 383/384 Bangkok - Chachoengsao Junction - Bangkok
 Ordinary train No. 385/386 Bangkok - Chachoengsao Junction - Bangkok
 Ordinary train No. 391/394 Bangkok - Chachoengsao Junction - Bangkok

References 
 "ขึ้นเหนือ|ล่องใต้|ไปอีสาน|และตะวันออก" กำหนดเวลาเดินรถ เดือนมิถุนายน 2562 ("To north|down south|go Isan|and east"), Train Timetables June 2019  (Free pamphlet) 

Railway stations in Thailand